Havasu Falls (Havasupai: Havasuw Hagjahgeevma) is a waterfall of Havasu Creek, located in the Grand Canyon, Arizona, United States. It is within Havasupai tribal lands.

Geography

It is the more famous and most visited of the various falls along Havasu Creek. It consists of one main chute that drops over a  vertical cliff into a series of plunge pools. High calcium carbonate concentration in the water creates the vivid blue-green color and forms the natural travertine dams that occur in various places near the falls.

Due to the effects of flash floods, the appearance of Havasu Falls and its plunge pools has changed many times. Prior to the flood of 1910, water flowed in a near continuous sheet, and was known as Bridal Veil Falls. The notch through which water flows first appeared in 1910, and has changed several times since. Water currently flows as one stream. In the past, there were sometimes multiple streams, or a continuous flow over the edge.

Recreation
There are many picnic tables on the opposite side of the creek, and it is easy to cross over by following the edges of the pools. It is possible to swim behind the falls and enter a small rock shelter behind it. However, drownings have occurred.
From the trail head parking lot, until the Supai Village, there is no access to drinking water. Hikers are advised to bring their own water with them.  In the town of Supai, there is a general store and cafe where food and beverage can be purchased.  The hike from Hualapai Hilltop to the lodge and tourist office in Supai is 8 miles. There is an additional hike of 2 miles to the falls and campground.

Campground

A campground is located nearby. Visitors are required to reserve permits prior to their travel to the Havasupai Indian Reservation.

Featured
Havasu Falls appeared in the 2007 movie Next starring Nicolas Cage, Julianne Moore, and Jessica Biel.

The falls also appear in Beyoncé's 2019 music video for "Spirit", a song written for the remake of The Lion King.

See also
 Navajo Falls
 Mooney Falls
 Beaver Falls, Arizona

References

External links

 
 
 
 Havasu Falls, Havasupai Indian Reservation History

Waterfalls of Arizona
Plunge waterfalls
Grand Canyon
Havasupai
Landforms of Coconino County, Arizona